Fox & Parrot Wood is a broadleaf woodland in County Durham, England, about  west of Chester-le-Street. It is situated just north of the B6313, near the village of Craghead. The wood forms part of the Great North Forest, which is one of England's community forests, and is adjacent to Twizell Wood, which lies to the north. Fox & Parrot Wood was originally planted in 1998 as part of a joint project between the Woodland Trust and the Forestry Commission. Further planting took place in 2004. As with other Woodland Trust woods, it is freely open to the public, with five access points.

The forest was named after Dr Fox, a local GP in the 1950s, who was known for his pet parrot.

References

Forests and woodlands of County Durham